Vanadis (minor planet designation: 240 Vanadis) is a fairly large main-belt asteroid. It is very dark and is classified as a C-type asteroid, probably composed of primitive carbonaceous material.

It was discovered by A. Borrelly on August 27, 1884, in Marseilles and was named after Freyja (Vanadis), the Norse fertility goddess.

References

External links
 The Asteroid Orbital Elements Database
 Minor Planet Discovery Circumstances
 Asteroid Lightcurve Data File
 
 

Background asteroids
Vanadis
Vanadis
C-type asteroids (Tholen)
C-type asteroids (SMASS)
18840827